Scolizona is a genus of moths in the family Lecithoceridae.

Species
Three species were included in Kyu-Tek Park's circumscription:
Scolizona palinoides Park, 2011
Scolizona rhinoceros (Diakonoff, 1954)
Scolizona ulnaformis Park, 2011

Distribution
Papua province of Indonesia and Papua New Guinea.

Etymology
The generic name is derived from the Greek scoli (meaning curved) and zona (meaning belt) and refers to the strongly recurved labial palpus.

References

Lecithocerinae
Moth genera